Benjamin Kibebe (born August 13, 1981) is a Swedish professional former footballer who played as a defender. He won one cap for the Sweden national team in 2001.

Career

Early career
Kibebe was born in Addis Ababa and moved to Sweden as a child. He began his career with local side Hammarby IF but in 1999 moved to their bitter rivals AIK as a senior played. He has said that the only reason he crossed the divide is that AIK offered him a professional contract and Hammarby didn't. During his time at AIK he was capped once for Sweden.

Norway
He spent 5 seasons with AIK and in 2005 moved to Norway to play in the Tippeligaen for Tromsø IL, the northernmost top-level football club in the world. Due to this Kibebe said that the team had to travel to most matches via plane. Kibebe had a successful year living in Tromsø as he played in the UEFA Cup. The club beat Danish club Esbjerg fB in the qualifying round then Turkish club Galatasaray in the First Round to qualified to the group stages. The team were drawn in Group E alongside AS Roma, RC Strasbourg, FC Basel and Red Star Belgrade.

At the end of the 2006 season Kibebe left Tromsø IL for Aalesunds FK who had just been promoted from the 1. divisjon at the end of the 2006 season after finishing as runners up.

Denmark
After a successful time at Aalesund he was sold to Danish team FC Nordsjælland. In Denmark he quickly made a good name for himself where he was a strong contributor to helping the team win the Danish Cup 2010 for the first time in the club's history. Kibebe is noted for 21 games in the UEFA cup and scored the first goal of the FC Nordsjælland's UEFA Cup contest against the Scottish club Queen of the South.

Switzerland
On 5 May 2010, the day after FC Nordsjælland's Danish Cup victory he was bought by the Swiss Club FC Luzern. Kibebe signed a three-year contract.

International career
Kibebe has played one match for the Sweden national team in 2001, and represented the Sweden U17 and U21 teams between 1997 and 2002.

External links
https://www.youtube.com/watch?v=ixb1YaUy1bc
https://www.youtube.com/watch?v=8WobRQpON1w
http://www.ethiosports.com/2010/11/01/q-a-benjamin-%E2%80%9Cbenyam%E2%80%9D-kibebe-of-fc-luzern-switzerland/
FCL buys a Swedish defender

References

1981 births
Living people
Ethiopian emigrants to Sweden
Swedish footballers
Sweden international footballers
AIK Fotboll players
Aalesunds FK players
Tromsø IL players
FC Midtjylland players
FC Nordsjælland players
Allsvenskan players
Eliteserien players
Danish Superliga players
Swedish expatriate footballers
Expatriate footballers in Norway
Swedish expatriate sportspeople in Norway
Expatriate men's footballers in Denmark
Swedish expatriate sportspeople in Denmark
FC Luzern players
Swiss Super League players
Expatriate footballers in Switzerland
Swedish expatriate sportspeople in Switzerland
Association football defenders
Sportspeople from Addis Ababa